Chrysopsis delaneyi, or DeLaney's goldenaster, is one of the endemic species to the U.S. state of Florida, recently discovered in the genus Chrysopsis, a small group of herbaceous plants of the family Asteraceae, known commonly as the "golden asters" and primarily native and restricted to Florida.

History
Several species of Chrysopsis previously unknown to science have been discovered in recent decades.  Among these, is Chrysopsis delaneyi, "DeLaney's goldenaster", which was discovered in the mid-1980s by Kris DeLaney, a central Florida botanist.

Habitat
Chrysopsis delaneyi is endemic to Florida, where it is highly endangered and has a very restricted range.  By the mid 20th century most of its original longleaf pine / turkey oak sandhill ecosystem and habitat were removed by corporate citrus farming.

Most of the Chrysopsis species are endemic to Florida, being limited to relatively small regions of Florida's well-drained, sandy ridges.  The plants occur in dry, nutrient-poor, xeric upland ecosystems, including sand pine scrub, longleaf pine / turkey oak sandhills.  They are weakly perennial in habit, bright green, tall and leafy, produce large, "lettuce-like" rosettes, and are covered with viscid (resin-producing) hairs (glandular-stipitate trichomes).  The flowers are borne at the tops of leafy stems that are up to 1.5 m tall, and are bright yellow and range from about 2.4 cm to 5.0 cm in diameter.

Description
Chrysopsis delaneyi is morphologically and genetically variable.  It is represented by a complex of ecotypes and/or varieties associated and adapted to Florida's major ridges and discrete upland systems.  The plant is restricted primarily to four major metapopulations: Lake Wales Ridge (LWR), Orange County Ridge (OCR), southern Atlantic Coastal Ridge (ACR), and a system of geologically younger, lower ridges between the LWR and ACR.  [the ridges are generally as per described and mapped by William White (1970); Geomorphology of Florida, USGS].

Chrysopsis delaneyi was formally described in 2003, and named in honor of its discoverer.  Although locally abundant at some small sites, the species is highly endangered due to a near complete loss of its original habitat.  Morphological and genetic analysis suggests that the metapopulations of C. delaneyi may actually represent distinct taxa which may have arisen from genetic bottle-necking and subsequent long-term, island-like biogeographic isolation.

Kris DeLaney (1951-*) has discovered many other new species of plants in central Florida, including a second golden aster, C. highlandsensis (Highlands County goldenaster).

References

External links
Flora of North America: Chrysopsis delaneyi
The Botanical Explorer: Chrysopsis delaneyi

photo of herbarium specimen at Missouri Botanical Garden, type specimen of Chrysopsis delaneyi

delaneyi
Endemic flora of Florida
Plants described in 2003
Taxa named by John Cameron Semple